Vasco Giuseppe Bertelli  (23 January 1924 − 2 November 2013) was an Italian Prelate of the Catholic Church.  

Vasco Giuseppe Bertelli was born in Pontedera ordained a priest on 5 April 1947. Bertelli was appointed bishop of the Diocese of Volterra on 25 May 1985 and ordained on 29 June 1985. Bertelli would retire from the diocese on 18 March 2000.

See also
Diocese of Volterra

References

External links
Catholic-Hierarchy 
Volterra Diocese (Italian)

20th-century Italian Roman Catholic bishops
Bishops of Volterra
1924 births
2013 deaths